Halvor Bergan (8 August 1931 – 3 May 2015) was a Norwegian theologian and priest.  He served as the Bishop of the Diocese of Agder from 1983 until his retirement in 1998.

Personal life
He was born 8 August 1931 in Skien in Telemark county, Norway.  He died on 3 May 2015.

Education and career
Bergan graduated from the Menighetsfakultetet school in 1957 with a Cand.theol. degree.  He was ordained by the Bishop of the Diocese of Stavanger, Karl Marthinussen, in 1958.  Later, in 1980, he graduated from the University of Oslo with a Doctor of Theology degree, with a thesis on church history. 

He began his career in 1958 as an assistant priest in Håland, just west of Stavanger.  Then, in 1966, he took a new job as an assistant priest in Solum, just west of Skien. From 1971-1980, he was the first parish priest for the new parish of Nenset in Solum.  From 1980 until 1983, he served as the parish priest of Sauherad.  In 1983, Halvor Bergan was appointed to be the Bishop of the Diocese of Agder, based at Kristiansand Cathedral.  He held this role until the end of 1998 when he retired and moved to Melum in Skien.

Works
 (1982 - his doctoral thesis)
 (1993)

References

1931 births
2015 deaths
People from Skien
Bishops of Agder og Telemark